Yeah! Yeah! Die! Die! (Death Metal Symphony in Deep C) is the sixth studio album by Waltari that combines death metal with classical music. Originally, Yeah! Yeah! Die! Die! was written as a stage show. After the show's premiere performance in 1995 at the Helsinki Music Festival, it was recorded and finally released in May 1996.

History 
Yeah! Yeah! Die! Die! was written by Kärtsy Hatakka between 1992 and 1995. By the end of 1994, Hatakka got in contact with Riku Niemi, a Finnish conductor, composer and leader of Avanti! symphony orchestra. After Niemi became involved in the project, Hatakka finalized the work and Niemi arranged it for symphony orchestra. The premiere show was performed by Waltari on 22 August 1995 at the "Taiteiden Yö" festival in Helsinki (Helsinki Music Festival), Finland together with Avanti! symphony orchestra, conducted by Niemi.

After the stage show, Yeah! Yeah! Die! Die! was recorded between September and November 1995, and in May 1996 the album Yeah! Yeah! Die! Die! Death Metal Symphony in Deep C was released in Germany, Austria and Switzerland. Yeah! Yeah! Die! Die! was performed once again in 1997 in Turku, Finland, supported by Turku Symphony Orchestra.

Content 
Yeah! Yeah! Die! Die! features the story of John Doe (Kärtsy Hatakka) whose life is being controlled by a central "computer brain" (Tomi Koivusaari). An angel Eeva-Kaarina Vilke) helps John Doe defeat the computer brain, but without this controlling force John Doe feels lost. He changes his mind and decides to save the computer brain. At the end the libretto says "everybody simply decides to vanish into thin air and disappear into the pages of internet!"

Track listing

Personnel 
Kärtsy Hatakka – bass guitar, vocals (Waltari)
Jariot Lehtinen – guitar (Waltari)
Sami Yli-Sirniö – additional guitars (Waltari)
Roope Latvala – guitar (Waltari)
Janne Parviainen – drums (Waltari)
Tomi Koivusaari (of Amorphis) – vocals
Eeva-Kaarina Vilke – vocals
Kimmo Kajasto – keyboards
Avanti! symphony orchestra, conducted by Riku Niemi

Charts

References

External links 
jÖrGs waltari world Yeah! Yeah! Die! Die!. Retrieved 29 September 2005. Contains an interview with Hatakka and Niemi as well as lyrics.

Waltari albums
1996 albums
Concept albums